Bengtsfors is a locality and the seat of Bengtsfors Municipality, Västra Götaland County, Sweden. It had 3,080 inhabitants in 2010. Bengtsfors Church is in Bengtsfors.

References 

Populated places in Västra Götaland County
Populated places in Bengtsfors Municipality
Municipal seats of Västra Götaland County
Swedish municipal seats
Dalsland